LaToya Greenwood (c. 1974) is a Democratic member of the Illinois House of Representatives who has represented the 114th district since January 2017. The 114th district includes Belleville, Brooklyn, Cahokia Heights, East St. Louis, Fairview Heights, Mascoutah, Millstadt, O'Fallon, Sauget, Scott Air Force Base, Shiloh, Swansea and Washington Park. Prior to her election to the Illinois House of Representatives, she served as a member of the East St. Louis City Council and Director of Human Resources for East St. Louis School District 189. She has a Bachelor of Arts from Michigan State University and a Master of Public Administration from Southern Illinois University at Edwardsville.

As of July 3, 2022, Representative Greenwood is a member of the following Illinois House committees:

 Agriculture & Conservation Committee (HAGC)
 Appropriations - Elementary & Secondary Education Committee (HAPE)
 Appropriations - Human Services Committee (HAPH)
 Citizen Impact Subcommittee (HMAC-CITI)
 Cybersecurity, Data Analytics, & IT Committee (HCDA)
 (Chairwoman of) Health Care Availability & Access Committee (HHCA)
 Labor & Commerce Committee (HLBR)
 Museums, Arts, & Cultural Enhancement Committee (HMAC)
 Prescription Drug Affordability Committee (HPDA)
 Public Utilities Committee (HPUB)

References

External links

1970s births
Living people
People from East St. Louis, Illinois
African-American state legislators in Illinois
Democratic Party members of the Illinois House of Representatives
Women state legislators in Illinois
Women city councillors in Illinois
African-American women in politics
Michigan State University alumni
Southern Illinois University alumni
African-American city council members in Illinois
21st-century American politicians
21st-century American women politicians
21st-century African-American women
21st-century African-American politicians
20th-century African-American people
20th-century African-American women